Victorino Martín Andrés (6 March 1929 – 3 October 2017) was a Spanish fighting bull cattle rancher. He was born in Galapagar, 33 kilometers from the city of Madrid. The livestock of which he was owner was founded on 29 May 1919 and, together with Duke of Veragua and Miura is one of the most notable in the history of bull fighting in Spain.

Biography 
Until the mid of 1960s, Martín was a cattle rancher who was not well-considered and whose cattle were refused to be killed by many diestros for their ferocity, sometimes accompanied by meekness. The pardon of the bull 'Belador' made him famous and start quoting as a real figure in the bullfighting world. It is one of the favorite cattle to be shown in the ciclos toristas de las ferias.

 
His son, Victorino Martín García, a veterinarian by profession, is currently in charge of directing livestock, controlling also his two other recently created hierros: 'Monteviejo' - called as one of his estates- whose encaste is from Vega- Villar, and Livestock of Urcola - of origin Urcola, after the purchase of a quarter of the cattle ranch of Francisco Galache Cobaleda, livestock of Villavieja of Yeltes, in Salamanca Province.

He received the "Grand Cross of the Order of Dos de Mayo" (Gran Cruz del Orden de Dos de Mayo) in 2011, the highest award granted by the Community of Madrid, and the Culture Prize of Community of Madrid in the category of Bullfighting in 2012. He died on 3 October 2017, at the age of 88, in his property, in the municipal term of Moraleja, Cáceres, due to a stroke.

References

External links

 Web de Victorino Martín

1929 births
2017 deaths
People from Madrid
Spanish cattlemen